The Kaweka Range (also known as the Kaweka Ranges) of mountains is located in inland Hawke's Bay in the eastern North Island (Te Ika-a-Māui) of New Zealand. It forms part of the mountainous spine of the North Island which extends from Wellington to East Cape, including the Tararua and Ruahine ranges.

The range lies between the city of Napier,  to the southeast, and Lake Taupō,  to the northwest. It is the source of many rivers which flow into Hawke Bay, including among them the Tutaekuri, Mohaka, and Ngaruroro Rivers.

The highest point in the range is Kaweka J.  The bush line varies from 1000 m to 1300 m.

A tramping track follows the ridge line of the entire range. The Kaweka challenge is a running race held annually in the range since 1990.

See also
Kaweka Challenge
Kaweka Forest Park

References

Hastings District
Landforms of the Hawke's Bay Region
Mountain ranges of New Zealand